Mysteries of London is a 1915 British silent crime film directed by A. E. Coleby and starring Wingold Lawrence and Flora Morris. The film may have taken its inspiration from the Victorian penny dreadful The Mysteries of London.

Synopsis
A clerk is framed for a crime, but is freed in time to save his daughter from being murder for her inheritance.

Cast
 Wingold Lawrence as Bob Willis 
 Flora Morris as Louise Willis

References

Bibliography
 Palmer, Scott. British Film Actors' Credits, 1895-1987. McFarland, 1988.

External links

1915 films
Films set in London
1915 crime films
British crime films
British silent feature films
Films directed by A. E. Coleby
British black-and-white films
1910s English-language films
1910s British films